Izzy is a common nickname for the given names Israel, Isaac, Isambard, Isidor, Isidore, Isidora, Isabel, Isobel, Isabelle, Isabella, Isaiah, Ishmael, Izzet, Isarn, Ismail, Isra, Izebel, Izmara, Isobelle, Isaura or Isam (عصام).

Izzy, Izzie, Issie, Issy, Isy or Izy may refer to:

People

Izzy
 Israel Adesanya (born 1989), Nigerian-born New Zealand mixed martial artist, kickboxer and boxer
 Israel Izzy Alcántara (born 1971), former baseball player from the Dominican Republic
 Israel Izzy Asper (1932–2003), Canadian tax lawyer and media magnate
 Isabelle Beisiegel (born 1979), Canadian golfer
 Isaiah Brown (born 1997), English footballer
 John Izzy Canillo (born 2004), Filipino child actor
 Isidor/Isadore Izzy Einstein (c. 1880–1938), American federal police officer during the early Prohibition era
 Isidore Izzy Goldstein (1909–1993), Major League Baseball pitcher
 Isadore Izzy Gomez (restaurateur) (1875 or 1876–1944), Portuguese-born San Francisco restaurateur
 Ezomo Izzy Iriekpen (born 1982), English former footballer
 Jason Isringhausen (born 1972), American former Major League Baseball pitcher and coach
 Israel Izzy Katzman (1917–2007), American sportswriter
 Israel Izzy Lang (born 1942), American former National Football League running back
 Isidoro Izzy León (1911–2002), Major League Baseball pitcher from Cuba
 Israel George Levene (1885–1930), American collegiate football player and head coach
 Isadore Schwartz (1900–1988), American boxer, world flyweight champion from 1927 to 1929
 Isadore Sparber (1906–1958), American storyboard artist, writer, director and producer of animated films
 Isidor I. F. Stone (1907–1989), American investigative journalist, also the "Izzy Awards," a journalism prize named for him bestowed by Roy H. Park School of Communications at Ithaca College
 Isabelle Izzy Westbury (born 1990), English cricketer
 Julius Izzy Yablok (1907–1983), American football player
 Israel Izzy Young (1928-2019), American folk music store owner

Issie, Issy or Isy
 Isabella Blow (1958–2007), English magazine editor
 Isadore Coop (1926–2003), Canadian architect
 Isadore Sharp (born 1931), Canadian hotelier and writer, founder and chairman of Four Seasons Hotels and Resorts
 Isobel Isy Suttie (born 1978), English musical comedian, actress and writer

Stage name
 Izzy Bizu, singer songwriter Isobel Beardshaw (born 1994)
 Issy Bonn, British Jewish actor, singer and comedian born Benjamin Levin (1903–1977)
 Isobel Cooper (born 1975), English operatic pop soprano known professionally as Izzy
 Izzy Stradlin, former Guns N' Roses guitarist and co-founder Jeffrey Dean Isbell (born 1962)

Fictional characters
 Izzy Armstrong, on the British soap opera Coronation Street
 Izzy Daniels, the main character in the Disney Channel television film Jump In!, portrayed by Corbin Bleu
 Izzy Davies, on the British soap opera Hollyoaks
 Izzy Gomez, in the television series TUGS
 Izzy Hawthorne, one of the main characters from the 2022 3D-animated film Lightyear
 Isabelle Hoyland, on the Australian soap opera Neighbours
 Isabelle "Izzy" Huffstodt, on the American television series Huff
 Izzy Izumi, in the Digimon series
 Izzy Mandelbaum, recurring character on the American television series Seinfeld, portrayed by Lloyd Bridges
Izzy Moonbow, in My Little Pony: A New Generation
 Izzy Moreno, the informant for Sonny and Rico in the American television series Miami Vice, portrayed by Martin Ferrero
 Ismael Ortega, a Marvel Comics character
 Izzy Sinclair, in the Doctor Who comic strip
 Izzy Sparks, a video game character 
 Izzie Stevens, in the series Grey's Anatomy
 Isabel "Izzy" Reubens, in Love and Rockets
 Izzy, one of the titular characters of Ben & Izzy, a Jordanian animated television series
 Izzy, from the Canadian animated television series Total Drama
 Izzy, a 7-year old pirate girl from the TV show Jake and the Never Land Pirates
 Isabelle "Izzy" Silva, one of the main characters on the TV show You Me Her
 Irreverent Izzy, a non-playable character mentioned in the PlayStation 4 exclusive video game, "Bloodborne"
 Izzy Hands, a character in the HBO show "Our Flag Means Death" based on the historical pirate Israel Hands

Legendary creatures
 Issie, a Japanese lake monster

Mascots
 Izzy (mascot), the 1996 Summer Olympics mascot
 Izzy the Islander, mascot of Texas A&M University–Corpus Christi

See also
 Isi (name)
 Isaac (disambiguation)
 Izak (disambiguation)
 Isaacs (disambiguation)
 Ishak (disambiguation)
 Isaiah (disambiguation)
 Isidore (disambiguation)
 Israel (disambiguation)
 Isabel (disambiguation)
 Isabella (disambiguation)
 Isabelle (disambiguation)
 Isobel (disambiguation)

Unisex given names
Hypocorisms